Michael Forshaw (born 5 January 1970) is an English former professional rugby league and rugby union footballer who is currently the defence coach for the Wales national rugby union team.

He began his playing career with Wigan in 1987 and went on to play for Wakefield Trinity (captain) (Heritage № 1048), Bradford Bulls and Warrington Wolves. Known as the "ultimate professional", he played for Great Britain.

Background
Born 5 January 1970 in Wigan, Lancashire, Forshaw had a brief stint at Saracens F.C. (RU), and was briefly the Player Performance Lifestyle Advisor for the Rugby Football League.

Playing career

Rugby league
During the 1991–92 Rugby Football League season, Forshaw played for defending champions Wigan from the interchange bench in their 1991 World Club Challenge victory against the visiting Penrith Panthers.

In 1997 he was named in the Super League Dream Team. In the 1997 post season, Forshaw was selected to play for Great Britain in two matches of the Super League Test series against Australia. Forshaw won caps for Great Britain while at Bradford Bulls in 1997 against Australia (ASL) (2 matches) (interchange/substitute), in 1998 against New Zealand (interchange/substitute), in 1999 against New Zealand (interchange/substitute), in 2001 against France (interchange/substitute), and Australia (3 matches), in 2002 against New Zealand (3 matches), and in 2003 against Australia (2 matches), and Australia (interchange/substitute).

Forshaw played for Bradford Bulls from the interchange bench in the 1999 Super League Grand Final which was lost to St. Helens. Forshaw won caps for England while at Bradford Bulls in 2000 against Australia, Ireland, and New Zealand.
As Super League VI champions, the Bradford Bulls played against 2001 NRL Premiers, the Newcastle Knights in the 2002 World Club Challenge.

Coaching career

Rugby league
After retiring from playing in 2004 he rejoined Warrington to look after Strength & Conditioning of the players until November 2006.
He returned to his boyhood club and teamed up with his old coach Brian Noble in December 2006 when he took over as strength & conditioning coach for Wigan Warriors.

He studied a BSc part-time at UCLAN following Wigan's sponsorship by UCLAN.

He then had a stint at Connacht in the Celtic League.

Rugby union
In 2013 Forshaw joined Sale Sharks, as defence coach. Forshaw follows a ‘3D’ approach to the contact area of defence: discipline, detail and decision-making, with a particular focus when within 50m of own try line. In July 2020 Forshaw extended his contract with Sale until the end of the 2022 season.

In 2023, after a decade at Sale, Forshaw was appointed as defence coach for the Welsh national team for the  2023 Six Nations Championship.

References

External links
(archived by web.archive.org) Bull Masters – Mike Forshaw
(archived by web.archive.org) 2001 Ashes profile
Bulls clinch World Club Challenge
Bradford move clear
Forshaw gives Bulls another boost
Waite: Forshaw can continue
Withers gets Ashes nod
Rivals tackle selection posers
Bulls hit back to beat Vikings
Wigan 30–18 Warrington
Cooke given Tri-Nations lifeline
Forshaw tips Bulls for title
Forshaw blow for Warrington
Bradford Bulls
Forshaw is handed key Wolves role
land Forshaw
Forshaw takes Wigan coaching role
Kear spoilt for choice
Peacock ready to strut his stuff
Ton-up England hammer US
Kear rings the changes
Your verdict on Bradford's Final win
Your Super League Dream Team
Sunday 13 April
Briers called up to GB squad
Keiron is lone Welsh star

1970 births
Living people
Bradford Bulls players
Connacht Rugby non-playing staff
England national rugby league team players
English rugby league coaches
English rugby league players
English rugby union coaches
English rugby union players
Great Britain national rugby league team players
Lancashire rugby league team players
Leeds Rhinos players
Rugby league halfbacks
Rugby league hookers
Rugby league locks
Rugby league players from Wigan
Rugby league second-rows
Rugby league utility players
Rugby union players from Wigan
Sale Sharks coaches
Wakefield Trinity captains
Wakefield Trinity players
Warrington Wolves players
Wigan Warriors players